Jeremy Callaghan (born 22 July 1967 in Papua New Guinea) is an Australian actor whose portrayal of the cute and shy Constable Brian Morley on the popular TV drama Police Rescue ensured international attention. Callaghan is also well known for his guest appearances on Xena: Warrior Princess (portraying Palaemon and Pompey) and Young Hercules (portraying Pollux).

Biography 

The blonde and blue-eyed Jeremy Callaghan grew up in Perth, Western Australia with his parents, brother and sister. He graduated from Murdoch University with a B.A. in theatre media and communications in 1987. In 1991, he graduated from the Western Australian Academy of Performing Arts (WAAPA), and then moved to Sydney to find work.

Career 

Jeremy Callaghan's big break came in 1992 with the role as Constable Brian Morley on Police Rescue (also starring Gary Sweet, Sonia Todd, Steve Bisley and Tammy MacIntosh). The character was introduced in the second series episode "Stakeout", and Callaghan stayed on the show until the end of the fourth series. In 1993, his work earned him an AFI Award nomination for "Best Actor in a Leading Role in a Television Drama" for the episode "Whirlwind", but the award went to Peter Phelps for the G.P. episode "Exposed". Callaghan also starred in the 1994 feature film Police Rescue: The Movie.

In 1996, Jeremy Callaghan played Detective Senior Constable Kevin Holloway in the first season of Water Rats (with Colin Friels and Catherine McClements). In 2002, he played Dave Gorman in the last season of Something in the Air.

Over the years, Callaghan has guest-starred on a host of other TV series, including Blue Heelers, Murder Call, G.P. in 1993 and 1996, SeaChange, The Lost World, BeastMaster, Holby City, MDA, Young Hercules, and Xena: Warrior Princess. On many of the shows, he appeared in more than one episode, sometimes portraying a recurring character, sometimes not.

Moreover, Jeremy Callaghan has starred in movies like Southern Cross (2001) and the critically acclaimed The Great Raid (2005) (alongside Benjamin Bratt and James Franco) as well as a few TV movies like Secret Men's Business, Halifax f.p: The Scorpion's Kiss, and The Munsters' Scary Little Christmas. He has also performed extensively in theatre, commercials, and in short films like Elvis Killed My Brother (1990) , Bits & Pieces (1996) and Larger Than Life (1997).

Since 2005, Callaghan has taken a hiatus from acting.  As of 2016 he was living with photographer Gaelle Le Boulicaut in Vannes, France where he works as a journalist.

Filmography

Film

Television

References

External links 

Australian male film actors
Australian male television actors
Australian male stage actors
Australian expatriates in France
Male actors from Perth, Western Australia
1967 births
Living people